The UNFP Player of the Month trophy is an award that recognises the best Ligue 1 player each month of the season. The winner is chosen by a combination of an online public vote, which contributes to 50% of the final tally, and the players of each Ligue 1 and Ligue 2 clubs.

A similar award goes to the best player in Ligue 2.

Ligue 1

Winners

Multiple winners
The below table lists those who have won on more than one occasion.

Awards won by nationality

Awards won by club

Footnotes

References 

Association football player of the month awards
Footballers in France
Association football player non-biographical articles